Jaroso is an unincorporated community and a U.S. Post Office located in Costilla County, Colorado, United States.  The Jaroso Post Office has the ZIP Code 81138.

A post office called Joroso has been in operation since 1911. Jaroso is a name derived from Spanish meaning "willows".

Geography
Jaroso is located at  (37.003924,-105.623760).

References

Unincorporated communities in Costilla County, Colorado
Unincorporated communities in Colorado